Crockernwell is a small village with a Methodist church. It is located 2 miles west of Cheriton Bishop and 12 miles west of Exeter, Devon, England.

See also 
List of places in Devon

References

External links 
Crockernwell at Devon County Council

Villages in Devon